Sean Bentivoglio (born October 16, 1985) is a retired Canadian-Italian professional ice hockey forward who last played for the Cardiff Devils in the UK's EIHL.

Playing career
Bentivoglio was born in Thorold, Ontario. Undrafted, Bentivoglio played four years of collegiate hockey with Niagara University of the CHA.  In his senior year and captain of the Purple Eagles in the 2006–07 season, Sean was named the CHA's player of the year. After finishing his collegiate career, Sean made his professional debut with the AHL's Providence Bruins. Bentivoglio made an impact with the P-Bruins helping them get past the first round in the playoffs with 9 points in 13 games.

On May 21, 2007, Bentivoglio signed a three-year entry level contract with the New York Islanders. Sean was assigned to AHL affiliate, the Bridgeport Sound Tigers for the 2007–08 season. In the 2008–09 season, Sean matched his 32-point rookie campaign with the Sound Tigers and made his NHL debut with the Islanders in a 5-1 defeat to the Montreal Canadiens on April 2, 2009.

After three years within the Islanders organization, Sean left as a free agent. On July 22, 2010, he signed a one-year contract with German club Augsburger Panther of the DEL.

After a spell with Asiago, Bentivoglio joined the UK's Cardiff Devils for the 2016/17 season.

Bentivoglio remained with Cardiff until March 2020 when he announced his retirement.

Career statistics

Awards and honours

References

External links

1985 births
Living people
Augsburger Panther players
Bridgeport Sound Tigers players
Canadian ice hockey forwards
Asiago Hockey 1935 players
Cardiff Devils players
Ice hockey people from Ontario
New York Islanders players
Niagara Purple Eagles men's ice hockey players
People from Thorold
Providence Bruins players
Undrafted National Hockey League players
Canadian expatriate ice hockey players in Wales
Canadian expatriate ice hockey players in the United States
Canadian expatriate ice hockey players in Italy
Canadian expatriate ice hockey players in Germany